Seamus Sharkey (born 11 May 1990) is a Manx footballer who plays as a defender for Institute.

Career

Club career

Sharkey started his career with Irish second tier side Derry City, helping them earn promotion to the Irish top flight. Before he 2011 season, he signed for Southern Cross United in Australia. In 2014, he signed for Rochester Lancers in the United States. Before the 2015 season, Sharkey returned to Irish top flight club Derry City. Before the 2016 season, he signed for Limerick in the Irish second tier.

Before the 2017 season, he signed for Irish top flight team Sligo Rovers. Before the second half of 2018–19, Sharkey signed for Glenavon in the Northern Irish top flight, helping them win the 2019 Mid-Ulster Cup. In 2020, he signed for Northern Irish second tier outfit Institute.

International career

He represented Ellan Vannin at the 2014 ConIFA World Football Cup but missed the 2018 ConIFA World Football Cup.

References

External links

 

1990 births
Association football defenders
Derry City F.C. players
Expatriate soccer players in the United States
Finn Harps F.C. players
Glenavon F.C. players
Institute F.C. players
League of Ireland players
Limerick F.C. players
Living people
Major Arena Soccer League players
Manx footballers
NIFL Championship players
NIFL Premiership players
Sligo Rovers F.C. players